The 2007–08 international cricket season was from September 2007 and April 2008.

Season overview

Pre-season rankings

September

Kenya Twenty20 Quadrangular

ICC World Twenty20

Group stage

Super Eights

Knockout stage

Australia in India

October

South Africa in Pakistan

England in Sri Lanka

Canada in Kenya

Bermuda in Kenya

November

Pakistan in India

Sri Lanka in Australia

New Zealand in South Africa

West Indies in Zimbabwe

World Cricket League Division 2

Group stage

Finals and playoffs

December

New Zealand in Australia

West Indies in South Africa

India in Australia

Bangladesh in New Zealand

January

Zimbabwe in Pakistan

February

Commonwealth Bank Series

England in New Zealand

South Africa in Bangladesh

March

Ireland in Bangladesh

Sri Lanka in West Indies

South Africa in India

Australia in Pakistan
The Australia national cricket team was scheduled to tour Pakistan in March and April 2008, to play three Test matches and five One Day Internationals. The tour was cancelled by Australia due to concerns about the security of playing in the country. Following the 2008 general elections in Pakistan, there was continual violence, and some of the Australian players spoke about against travelling to compete in the series.

See also
Australian cricket team in 2007–08
International cricket in 2008

References

External links
2007/08 season on ESPN CricInfo

2007 in cricket
2008 in cricket